The Episcopal Church of Cuba is a diocese of the Episcopal Church in the United States (ECUSA or TEC). The diocese consists of the entire country of Cuba. From 1966 to 2020, it was an extra-provincial diocese under the Archbishop of Canterbury. , it had nearly 1,600 members and an average worship attendance of more than 600 in forty-four parishes, including the Cathedral of the Holy Trinity in Havana.

History
The Episcopal Church of Cuba traces its formal origins to 1901, when the House of Bishops of ECUSA established the Missionary District of Cuba under the jurisdiction of the Presiding Bishop. 

In 1966 ECUSA's House of Bishops withdrew the Cuban diocese from ECUSA association in the wake of the 1959 Cuban Revolution, which had strained communication and travel between the churches. After 1966, as an extra-provincial diocese, the Cuban church was under the oversight of a Metropolitan Council of the Primates of the Anglican Church of Canada, and the Church in the Province of the West Indies, as delegated by Archbishop of Canterbury. The diocese remained in full Anglican Communion throughout the period.

ECUSA voted at its 2018 General Convention to readmit the diocese.

Bishops of Cuba

Recent history and future structure
Internal divisions over a range of issues including the possibility of rejoining the Episcopal Church in the United States (ECUSA) and the election of a successor to Bishop Perera, led to a long period of instability within the Iglesia Episcopal de Cuba, which found itself unable to elect a bishop for many years. Bishop Miguel Tamayo Zaldívar, a native Cuban who moved to Uruguay to serve as a missionary and subsequently became Bishop of Uruguay in the Iglesia Anglicana de Sudamérica (formerly the Iglesia Anglicana del Cono Sur de las Americas), was appointed Interim Bishop in 2005.

Following a number of attempts at resolution of the problem, the Metropolitan Council, in February 2007, appointed Canon Nerva Cot Aguilera and Ulises Mario Aguero Prendes as suffragan bishops of the Iglesia Episcopal de Cuba to carry out pastoral oversight under the direction of Bishop Tamayo. They were consecrated on June 10, 2007. Cot Aguilera was the first woman to be appointed an Anglican bishop in Latin America. She expressed openness to ordaining openly gay and lesbian clergy. After a short retirement, Cot Aguilera died suddenly on July 10, 2010 after a brief battle with severe anemia. She was 71.

Bishop Tamayo worked industriously to heal divisions within the diocese, but repeated attempts to elect his successor ultimately failed. Following Bishop Tamayo's announcement in 2009 of his wish to resign (to focus on his ministry in Uruguay, ahead of his anticipated retirement in 2012-2013), and a further inconclusive election, the responsibility for an appointment fell again to the Metropolitan Council, which in January 2010 appointed Griselda Delgado Del Carpio as bishop coadjutor (assistant bishop with the right of succession). She was ordained to the episcopate on February 7, 2010 and following Bishop Tamayo's resignation was installed as diocesan on November 28, 2010.

A commission was formed to consider what processes would be needed to achieve a reunification, and the General Convention was expected to consider the matter in 2018.

In July 2018, at the 79th Episcopal General Convention, both the House of Bishops and the House of Deputies voted unanimously to re-admit the Episcopal Church of Cuba to ECUSA as a diocese of province II (also called the Atlantic Province), which includes dioceses from New York and New Jersey in the United States, Haiti, and the Virgin Islands.

References

External links

Iglesia Episcopal de Cuba official site
Anglican Communion site
Historical resources on Anglicanism in Cuba from Project Canterbury

Anglican Church in the Caribbean
Anglican dioceses established in the 20th century
Dioceses of the Episcopal Church (United States)
 
Protestantism in Cuba
Province 2 of the Episcopal Church (United States)